Olympos is a village and a former self-governing community on the island of Karpathos, in the Dodecanese, Greece. Since the 2011 local government reform it is part of the municipality Karpathos, of which it is a municipal unit. It is located in the northern part of the island. Population 556 (2011). The total land area of the community is 104.876 km².

History
In antiquity in this place there was the Doric city Vrykous or Vrycous. Vrykous was one of the three ancient cities of Karpathos. It was located near the village Avlona. Today a small part of the city and the walls are preserved  as well as some ruins from graves and three old Christian churches. The city of Vrykous was kept until the 7th or 8th century. Then the residents sought refuge in more mountainous areas on account of Saracen pirates. The refugees from Vrykous founded Olympos possibly in those years. Olympos was named after the mountain where it is  built. The name of the village is feminine (Η Όλυμπος/I Olympos) contrary to the name of the mountain that is masculine (Ό Όλυμπος/O Olympos). The name Elympos (Έλυμπος)  is used, mainly by local villagers. The villagers of Olympos kept the local dialect and the traditional costume due to the isolation of this place from the rest of Karpathos. The traditional style of the village attracts many tourists nowadays.

Historical population

Notable people
 Yannis Philippakis, frontman of the British indie band Foals

Photo gallery

References

External links
Map showing community of Olympus on Karpathos Island and Saria Island

Populated places in Karpathos (regional unit)